Kırkbulak can refer to:

 Kırkbulak, Palu
 Kırkbulak, Refahiye